Argentine Love is a 1924 American silent romantic drama film directed by Allan Dwan and based on a short story by Vicente Blasco Ibanez that stars Bebe Daniels.

In the film, the legal guardians of an Argentine woman arrange her marriage to a man of their choice, but are unaware that she already has a boyfriend. Her betrothed is determined to kill any rival suitors, and murders a senator's son for merely flirting with his fiancee.

Plot
As described in a review in a film magazine, during a two year absence in the United States, the guardians of Consuelo Garcia (Daniels) arrange her marriage to Juan Martin (Cortez), who lives in the same hometown in Argentina. However, she is in love with the American Philip Sears (Rennie), who is coming to her country to build a bridge, so she turns Juan down. Juan is furious and vows to kill anyone who comes between them, and does kill Rafael (Gonzales), the son of Senator Cornejo (Majeroni), after he sees him flirting with Consuelo. Juan sends a warning to Philip, who comes immediately. In the meantime, the populace vent their spite on Consuelo, beating her while she is tied to the end of a cart. Philip rescues her. To save his life, she pretends love for Juan, and Philip puts on Juan's cloak and hat to aid their escape. Consuelo tells Juan that she will marry him, but that she does not love him. Juan returns to the house and, saying that an Argentine is not to be outdone in gallantry by an American, gives himself up to the crowd and is shot by the murdered young man's father. Philip and Consuelo then find their path to happiness unobstructed.

Cast

Preservation
With no prints of Argentine Love located in any film archives, it is a lost film.

References

External links

Posters at cinematerial.com

1924 films
American silent feature films
Lost American films
Films based on works by Vicente Blasco Ibáñez
Films directed by Allan Dwan
Paramount Pictures films
1924 romantic drama films
American romantic drama films
American black-and-white films
Films with screenplays by Gerald Duffy
1924 lost films
Lost romantic drama films
1920s American films
Films with screenplays by John Russell (screenwriter)
Films set in Argentina
Arranged marriage in fiction
Silent romantic drama films
Silent American drama films
1920s English-language films